The Beaverfoot Range is a mountain range of the Canadian Rockies, located in southeastern British Columbia. The range extends from Cedared Creek near Spillimacheen north to the Kicking Horse River.

This range includes the following mountains and peaks:

References

Beaverfoot Range in the Canadian Mountain Encyclopedia

Mountain ranges of British Columbia
Ranges of the Canadian Rockies
Columbia Valley